Triangulation is the process of determining the location of a point by forming triangles to it from known points.

Triangulation may also refer to:

Arts, entertainment, and media
 Triangulation (chess), a maneuver in which one player moves a piece (often a king) in a triangular pattern in order to force the opponent to make a weakening move
 Triangulation (TWiT.tv), an interview podcast
 Triangulation (novel), a 1999 novel by Phil Whitaker

Mathematics and technology

Graph theory
 Plane triangulation, and a maximal planar supergraph of a graph G may be called a triangulation of G
 Triangulated graph, and a chordal completion of a graph G may be called a triangulation of G

Spatial subdivisions
 Triangulation (geometry), division of the Euclidean plane into triangles and of Euclidean spaces into simplices
 Triangulation (topology), generalizations to topological spaces other than Rd
 Point-set triangulation, division of the convex hull of a point set into triangles using only that set as triangle vertices
 Polygon triangulation, division of a polygon into triangles
 Surface triangulation, division of a surface into triangles

Other uses in mathematics and technology
 Triangulation (computer vision), the computation of a 3D point given its projection onto two, or more, images
 Triangulation (surveying), a process used in surveying to determine unknown distances, angles and positions from those that are known
 Mobile phone tracking, a process which uses triangulation (actually, trilateration) to calculate the location of the handset
 Schur triangulation, a process of finding an upper triangular matrix similar to a given matrix 
 Stellar triangulation, a method of geodesy which uses cosmic instead of terrestrial targets
 Triangulated category, a category defined by a set of axioms involving triangles of arrows
 Triangulation station, a fixed surveying station

Psychology and social sciences
 Triangulation (psychology), situation in which one person interacts with another person via an intermediary third person
 Triangulation (social science), the use of multiple cross-checked sources and methodology
 Karpman drama triangle, resulting from "triangulation", a psychological and social model of human interaction – typically among the roles of persecutor, victim, and rescuer

Other uses
 Triangulation (finance), a financial strategy whereby the relationship between three currencies is exploited
 Triangulation (politics), the act of a candidate presenting his or her ideology as "above and between" the left and right side of the political spectrum
 Triangulation Beach, in Antarctica

See also